Railway Nirapatta Bahini is a specialized security force under the state owned Bangladesh Railway responsible for providing security to railways and trains. It is under the Ministry of Railways. Md Fattah Bhuiyan is the Chief Commandant of Railway Nirapatta Bahini.

History
Railway Nirapatta Bahini was established in 1976 through the Railway Nirapatta Bahini Ordinance. The  Railway Nirapatta Bahini Ordinance of 1976 was repealed and replaced with an update ordinance in 2016. In 2006, personnel of the Bahini were accused of extorting passengers in the Eastern Zone.

As of 2013, Railway Nirapatta Bahini had about two thousand personal. It worked with Railway Police to ensure the safety and security of the rail system in Bangladesh. In 2019, the 11th batch of the Railway Nirapatta Bahini graduated and completed their passing parade at Paksey, Pabna District.

References

1976 establishments in Bangladesh
Organisations based in Dhaka
Government agencies of Bangladesh
Railroad police agencies
Bangladesh Railway
Law enforcement agencies of Bangladesh